Jacques Drevet (3 May 1832, Villefranche-sur-Saône - 11 May 1900, La Baule-Escoublac) was a French architect; primarily known for works in an Orientalist style.

Life and work 
As an architect employed by Isma'il Pasha, the Khedive of Egypt, he helped build the docks at Alexandria. He also assisted with the construction of the buildings for the Egyptian pavilion at the Exposition Universelle (1867), under the direction of the Egyptologist, François Auguste Ferdinand Mariette. Later, he recovered parts of the pavilion for use in a Moorish-style villa in Orsay, belonging to the sculptor, Charles Cordier. In 1868, he was named a Knight in the Legion of Honor. The following year, he was part of the entourage that accompanied the Empress Eugénie to the inauguration of the Suez Canal.

Between 1874 and 1886, he was periodically involved with work on two mansions belonging to the artist, in Paris. From 1883 to 1884 he built a mansion, now known as the Hôtel Judic, for the comic actress, Anna Judic. In 1990, it was designated a Monument historique.

Around 1897, he designed the annex to the post-office in La Baule-Escoublac, but it was demolished in the early 1960s, to make room for a new luxury apartment building. The adjoining street has since been named after him. 

He was married to Jeanne Lenormand; daughter of the architect .

References

Further reading 
 E. Hellé, Jacques Drevet architecte, 1832-1900, imprimerie Chaix, 1912; pg.84

External links 

1832 births
1900 deaths
French architects
French orientalists
Recipients of the Legion of Honour
People from Villefranche-sur-Saône